Katherine Jungjohann is a scientist and engineer at the Center for Integrated Nanotechnologies (CINT) which is part of Sandia National Laboratories in Albuquerque, New Mexico, United States.

Biography

Early life
Jungjohann grew up in an academic family.

Education
Jungjohann received her Bachelor of Science degree in Chemistry with honors from the University of Redlands, California, in 2008. She completed her Doctor of Philosophy degree in Materials Science and Engineering at the University of California, Davis, CA in 2012.

Career
Jungjohann finished off a postdoctoral fellowship at the Center for Functional Nanomaterials at Brookhaven National Laboratory before beginning a staff position at the Center for Integrated Nanotechnologies at Sandia National Laboratories in 2013.

Distinctions
 Nano Letters - Early Career Advisory Board (2016-2017)
 Microscopy Society of America's Focused Interest Group on Electron Microscopy in Liquids and Gases - Co-leader and Placement Office Chair
 Materials Research Society - Member, Speaker
 American Chemical Society - Member
 American Association for the Advancement of Science - Member

Publications
Jungjohann has over 150 publications. Her most cited work has been cited over 300 times.

Here is a sampling of her most cited works, each one has been cited more than 100 times:

Controlled growth of nanoparticles from solution with in situ liquid transmission electron microscopy
JE Evans, KL Jungjohann, ND Browning, I Arslan (2011)
	
In situ transmission electron microscopy study of electrochemical sodiation and potassiation of carbon nanofibers
Y Liu, F Fan, J Wang, Y Liu, H Chen, KL Jungjohann, Y Xu, Y Zhu, D Bigio, ... (2014)

Experimental procedures to mitigate electron beam induced artifacts during in situ fluid imaging of nanomaterials
TJ Woehl, KL Jungjohann, JE Evans, I Arslan, WD Ristenpart, ... (2013)

In situ liquid cell electron microscopy of the solution growth of Au–Pd core–shell nanostructures
KL Jungjohann, S Bliznakov, PW Sutter, EA Stach, EA Sutter (2013)

In situ liquid-cell electron microscopy of silver–palladium galvanic replacement reactions on silver nanoparticles
E Sutter, K Jungjohann, S Bliznakov, A Courty, E Maisonhaute, S Tenney, ... (2014)

Atomic-scale imaging and spectroscopy for in situ liquid scanning transmission electron microscopy
KL Jungjohann, JE Evans, JA Aguiar, I Arslan, ND Browning (2012)

Lithium Electrodeposition Dynamics in Aprotic Electrolyte Observed in Situ via Transmission Electron Microscopy
AJ Leenheer, KL Jungjohann, KR Zavadil, JP Sullivan, CT Harris (2015)

See also

Sandia National Laboratories
Los Alamos National Laboratory
Lawrence Livermore National Laboratory

References

External links

University of California, Davis alumni
University of Redlands alumni
American women engineers
American women chemists
Microscopists
Living people
Year of birth missing (living people)
21st-century American women scientists
21st-century American chemists
21st-century American engineers
21st-century women engineers
Members of the American Chemical Society
Sandia National Laboratories people